Seapoint RFC is a community-based Irish rugby club located in Killiney, County Dublin, playing in the Leinster League. The club also provides a key focal point for players attending rugby schools who live in the Cabinteely/Killiney/Ballybrack and greater Dun Laoghaire area.

Club colours

The Club colours are black, royal blue and green, with hooped jerseys and socks and black shorts.

Current professionals that played in Seapoint
 Felix Jones (Munster)
 Michael Noone (Jersey Rugby Football Club)
 Aaron Dundon (Leinster)
 Peter Lydon (London Scottish)

Club honours
Since 1973, Seapoint has won the following:
 All Ireland Junior Cup (2007 )
 Metropolitan Cup (2005, 2006, 2008)
 Spencer Cup (1973, 1980, 1995, 2001, 2003, 2004, 2007, 2009)
 Colm O'Shea Cup (2021)
 Leinster League Division 1 (2004, 2009 )
 Leinster League Division 2 (2003)
 Leinster League Division 2 (1995)
 Leinster League Division 3 (2001)
 Leinster Metro League Division 8 (2014)
 Junior 2 League (1977)
 Junior 3 League (1977)
 Junior 1B League (1978)
 Gale (Under 20) (1987, 2021)
 Metropolitan League (Under 18) (2000, 2001)
 O'Daly (Under 12) (1986)

Representative Honours

Ireland
 Felix Jones

Ireland Under-19
 Gary Foley
 Michael Noone

Ireland Under-20
 Gary Foley
 Michael Noone

Ireland Schools
 Gary Foley
 Michael Noone

Leinster & Leinster A
 Joe Brady
 Felix Jones
 Arron Dundon
 Michael No one

Munster & Munster A
 Felix Jones

Leinster Juniors
 Mark Barrett
 Sam Boazman
 Mark Coughlan
 Aaron Dundon
 J.P. Finlay
 Mark Garton
 Jamie Gill
 Peter Grehan
 Declan Griffin
 Zach Jungmann
 Brian Keegan
 Mark Kelly
 Paul Kelly
 Roie Mamane
 Andy McCleane
 Matt McKenna
 Bryan Murphy
 Tom O'Connor
 Stephen O'Connor
 Mark McCoy
 Peter O'Farrelly
 Simon Kelly
 Gerry Paley
 Stephen Verso
 Jonathon  Walsh
 Eddie Weaver
 Kenny Jones
 Barry Gaskin
 Eoin Quinn

Bold = Currently representing

Leinster U19 & 20's
 Eoin Cremin
 Gary Foley
 Felix Jones
 Ian Kelly
 Michael Noone

Leinster Youths
 Oisin Doyle
 Simon Kelly

Leinster Schools
 Eoin Cremin
 Gary Foley
 Michael Noone
 Frank Scully
 Simon Kelly
 Ross O'Carroll-Kelly - fictional character from the novel 'Game of Throw Ins'.

Connacht Schools
 Ken Concannon

Aidan Williams, who served with on the committee of the Association of Referees (Leinster Branch), was the president of that body in the season 1978-1979.

Notes and references

External links
 Seapoint RFC

Irish rugby union teams
Rugby clubs established in 1934
Rugby union clubs in Dún Laoghaire–Rathdown